Daniel Edward Moeller (March 23, 1885 – April 14, 1951) was an American professional baseball player.

Moeller was an outfielder in the Major Leagues from – and from –. During his career, he played for the Pittsburgh Pirates, Washington Senators, and Cleveland Indians.

In 704 games over seven seasons, Moeller posted a .243 batting average (618-for-2538) with 379 runs, 15 home runs, 192 RBI, 171 stolen bases and 302 bases on balls. He led the American League in strikeouts in 1912 and 1913. Defensively, he recorded a .939 fielding percentage playing at right and left field.

External links

1885 births
1951 deaths
Major League Baseball outfielders
Pittsburgh Pirates players
Washington Senators (1901–1960) players
Cleveland Indians players
Minor league baseball managers
Burlington Flint Hills players
Troy Trojans (minor league) players
Jersey City Skeeters players
Rochester Bronchos players
Des Moines Boosters players
Millikin Big Blue baseball players
Baseball players from Iowa
People from DeWitt, Iowa